Horisme albostriata is a moth of the family Geometridae. The species can be found in the Comoros and the adults have a wingspan of 30mm.

See also
 List of moths of the Comoros

References

Melanthiini
Moths of the Comoros
Moths described in 1907
Endemic fauna of the Comoros